Ronnie Caryl (born 10 February 1953, Liverpool) is an English guitarist. Over the years Caryl has worked alongside Phil Collins, plus David Hentschel, Michel Polnareff, Lulu, Stephen Bishop, Eric Clapton, Gary Brooker, Maggie Bell and John Otway.

Biography
Phil Collins was 18 when, with his friend and accomplice guitarist Ronnie Caryl, he accompanied American singer John Walker of the Walker Brothers on tour in Great Britain. The other two musicians were Gordon "Flash" Smith on bass and the ex-organist of the Warriors - former band of Jon Anderson -, Brian Chatton. When the tour ended, the four young musicians decided to stay together and try their luck as a group, so they formed Hickory and recorded a single 'Green Light/The Key released by CBS Records on January 24, 1969. This formation would eventually become the Flaming Youth band, when they met authors Ken Howard and Alan Blaikley who offered them to record an album. The group signed with Fontana Records and recorded the album Ark II in 1969, which was ranked "Album of the Month" by the British music magazine Melody Maker. The band played at the London Planetarium for the launch of the album in 1969. After giving a few concerts, the group no longer managed to generate interest from both the public and the media, and despite the addition of a new musician, the organist Rod Mayall the brother of John Mayall, Flaming Youth disbanded. And though the years Ronnie and Phil always remained friends, and Ronnie was best man at Phil's first wedding.  In 1970, they both auditioned for Genesis and whilst Collins obtained the job as drummer, Caryl was unsuccessful and after a brief stint with Mick Barnard on guitar, Steve Hackett was recruited as a permanent replacement lead guitarist for Anthony Phillips.

Caryl went on to play in some other bands, including Sanctuary in 1972, with whom he recorded an unreleased album. By the following year he joined the jazz rock outfit, Zox & the Radar Boys, including Peter Banks, Mike Piggott and Phil Collins.

He moved to France in 1995 with his wife Melanie.

In 1996, Caryl became an official member of Collins's group as a backing vocalist and rhythm guitarist. As well as work with Collins, Caryl has also performed alongside David Hentschel, Michel Polnareff, Lulu, Stephen Bishop, Eric Clapton, Gary Brooker, Maggie Bell and John Otway.

Caryl has released two solo albums, Leave A Light On (1994) and One Step at a Time (2003).

Discography

Flaming Youth

Singles
"Guide Me, Orion" – Fontana Records (1969)
"Man, Woman and Child" – Fontana Records (1970)
"From Now On (Immortal Invisible)" – Fontana Records (1970)

Albums
Ark 2 – Fontana Records (1969)

Solo

Singles
"You Got It" – Polydor Records (1983)
"Somewhere Within" – Full Colour Records (1994)

Albums
Leave A Light On – Full Colour Records (1994)
One Step at a Time – Outside Records (2003)

Session work
1975 : Album – David Hentschel: Startling Music
1975 : Album – Eugene Wallace: Dangerous
1977 : Single – Michel Polnareff: "Lettre A France"
1981 : Album – Lulu: Lulu
1982 : Album – Lulu: Take Me To Your Heart Again
1989 : Album – Stephen Bishop: Bowling in Paris
1996 : Album – Phil Collins: Dance into the Light
2004 : Album – Maggie Bell: The River Sessions (recorded live at the Pavilion in Glasgow, Scotland, on 1 November 1993)
2010 : Album – Phil Collins: Going Back

DVDs
1997 : Phil Collins – Live And Loose in Paris
2004 : Phil Collins – Finally...The First Farewell Tour
2007 : Phil Collins – The Long Goodnight: A Film About Phil Collins

Tours
1981 / 1983 : with Lulu
1987 : with John Otway
1993 : with Maggie Bell
1994 / 1995 : with The Free Spirit
1996 : with Phil Collins – 'Dance into the Light Tour'
1999 : with Phil Collins – 'Tarzan Tour'
2002 / 2003 : with Phil Collins – 'Testify Tour'
2003 : with Phil Collins – 'Brother Bear Tour'
2004 / 2005 : with Phil Collins – 'The First Farewell Tour'
2017 : with Phil Collins – 'Not Dead Yet Tour'

Different shows
1972 : Shoot Up at Elbow Creek
1977 : Elvis – Theatre musical
1986 : Tutti Frutti – BBC Television series with Emma Thompson
1992 / 1993 : Good Rockin' Tonight !

References

External links
 Official website
 Ronnie Caryl MySpace

1953 births
Living people
English blues guitarists
English male guitarists
English blues musicians
English blues singers
English rock bass guitarists
English rock guitarists
English rock singers
English male singer-songwriters
Musicians from Liverpool
Rhythm guitarists
English bass guitarists
Male bass guitarists
English expatriates in France
Flaming Youth (band) members